Agrotis gravis is a moth of the family Noctuidae. It is found from British Columbia, south to California.

It is only found on sandy ocean beaches, usually with foreshore dunes.

External links
Mentioning of the species in A new species of Copablepharon (Lepidoptera: Noctuidae) from British Columbia and Washington

Agrotis
Moths of North America
Moths described in 1874